Nordic identity in Estonia refers to the concept that Estonia is, or ought to be considered, one of the Nordic countries. The current mainstream view outside of Estonia does not usually include Estonia among Nordic countries, but categorizing it as a Nordic or Northern European country is common in Estonia.

A push towards being defined as a "Nordic" has existed in independent Estonia since the war of independence in 1918, however, gaining "official membership" of the Nordic region along with neighbouring Finland was interrupted by the occupation of the Soviet Union after World War II.  Estonia has been interested in joining the Nordic region again since 1991, when it regained its independence from the Soviet Union's occupation. The Estonian language is closely related to the Finnish language; both are Finnic languages. The Swedish indigenous minority called eestirootslased or rannarootslased in Estonian, and estlandssvenskar or aibofolket in Swedish, has attestably lived in Estonia since the 13th century, similarly to Finnish Swedes in Finland. The extensive settlement of Swedes in Northern and Western Estonia, especially in the islands and coastal areas, has had a significant impact on Estonian culture and also language. Historically, Swedes made up about 25% of the population of Tallinn (Reval), the capital, and even more in Haapsalu (Hapsal). The number of Swedes in Estonia, including in these cities, fell sharply due to the Soviet occupation. The Scandinavian connection from the Estonian Viking Age and later from being a part of the Danish and Swedish Empires for few centuries, especially Northern Estonia (historically called Estland), left a lasting influence on the creation of the Estonian identity during the national awakening period of the 19th century.

Some of the most important trade partners of Estonia are the Nordic countries. Estonia's largest import and export partners from the Nordic countries are Finland and Sweden (23% of all export and 20% of all import in July 2020). Three quarters of the investments that go to Estonia come from the Nordic countries, especially from Finland.

Public attitudes

Põhjamaad means both "Nordic countries" and "Northern countries" in the modern Estonian language. Whereas very few Estonians self-identify as Scandinavians, the ethnic Estonians' homeland has been almost invariably referred to as põhjamaa ("Northern country", instead of "Western" or "Eastern" country), both in Estonian popular culture and media, as well as in surveys of public opinion and statements made by leading politicians.

53.3% of ethnically Estonian youth consider belonging in the Nordic identity group as important or very important for them. 52.2% have the same attitude towards the "Baltic" identity group, according to a research study from 2013.

Sociologist Mikko Lagerspetz has observed that the attitudes towards the Nordic identity in the Estonian society can be grouped in three: (1) Estonia is already a Nordic country; (2) Estonia needs to become a Nordic country but is not there yet; (3) Estonia should walk its own unique path.

In 2020, the University of Tartu conducted a psychological survey with 6th grade students to find out, among other things, which countries they consider to be the most important and closest to Estonia. The study was performed by drawing. Ethnic Estonian students depicted Estonia the most, together with Sweden, Finland and other Nordic countries, leaving Latvia, Lithuania and Russia generally undrawn. Non-Estonian students (mostly Russians) on the contrary portrayed Estonia with the Baltic states and also with Russia. This shows that ethnic Estonian (6th graders) consider themselves as one of the Nordic nations and we can assume that this view is common in younger ethnic Estonians including young adults.

Modern political narrative
An important element in Estonia's post-independence reorientation has been closer ties with the Nordic countries, especially Finland and Sweden. In December 1999, then Estonian foreign minister (and President of Estonia from 2006 until 2016) Toomas Hendrik Ilves delivered a speech titled "Estonia as a Nordic Country" to the Swedish Institute for International Affairs. In 2003, the foreign ministry also hosted an exhibit called "Estonia: Nordic with a Twist".

In 2015, the Estonian prime minister Taavi Rõivas defined the country's narrative as a "New Nordic Country", or "Uus Põhjamaa".

A conference comprising the heads of the coalition government was held in September 2016, discussing Estonia's outlook as a Nordic country.

Kersti Kaljulaid, president of Estonia from 2016 to 2021, commented on views of then Estonian foreign minister Ilves, saying that she does not want to use "loaded words" like Nordic or Baltic but prefers to call like-minded countries of northern Europe the "Nordic Benelux".

The Nordic narrative is also communicated by government agencies: 
 Invest in Estonia – The national investment agency
 Brand Estonia 
 RMK – The national forestry organization
 Enterprise Estonia
 The Foreign Ministry

When state-owned Estonian flag carrier was renamed as Nordica in 2016, Erik Sakkov, then board member of the company, explained the airline's naming (according to some Estonian media outlets) with Estonia's continual self-identification among Nordic countries (Põhjamaad in Estonian) and with country's leaders wish to emphasize it in the name of the national carrier. However, similar explanation by Sakkov which was published on Nordica homepage in English, claimed that motivation behind naming was Estonia's alignment with "Northern Europe" and country's leaders wish to reflect that.

The Swedish ambassador to Estonia, Anders Ljunggren, said in 2015 that "Estonia would have been considered a Nordic country by the other Nordic countries, had the history been different...The differences between Estonia and Sweden have become less year by year, owing to the fact that the two countries have gotten to know each other more each year".

Criticism
The Tuglas foundation has claimed that the Nordic definition that Estonia is moving towards does not exist anymore, being a relic of past times.

Per Högselius, a Swede, wrote an opinion piece about the topic in 2003, looking at the idea as fringe, but concluding that "in time the Estonians might be able to persuade us".

Ethnic Estonians who were active during the process of regaining Estonia's independence are more likely to consider Estonia as a Baltic country instead of a Nordic country, because of the events that were undertaken together with the two nearby Baltic nations that were similarly occupied and annexed by the Soviet Union, to gain greater world attention (for example the Baltic Way in 1989). They usually represent the age group of 45 and older. It also has to do with Soviet propaganda that tried to replace the Finnish and Estonian relationship and bond with a "Baltic unity" bond as a Soviet geopolitical vision. This vision is still widespread outside of Estonia.

Historic contacts with the Nordic Council
The Nordic Council had historically been a strong supporter of Estonian independence from the Soviet Union. The Nordic Council of Ministers' Office in Estonia was opened in spring 1991.

Proposed flags

See also

 Baltoscandia
 Danish Estonia
 Estonian kroon
 Fennoscandia
 Intermarium
 Nordic-Baltic Eight
 Nordic countries
 Swedish Estonia
 Viking Age in Estonia

References

Political movements in Estonia
Nordic countries